The 2015 World Aesthetic Gymnastics Championships, the 16th edition, was held in Tórshavn, Faroe Islands, from May 25 to September 7, 2015 at the Ítróttarhøllin á Hálsi.

Participating nations

Medal winners

Results

Senior

The top 12 teams (2 per country) and the host country in Preliminaries qualify to the Finals.

References

External links
http://www.ifagg.com/competition/new-results/ 

2015 in Faroese sport
2015 in gymnastics
World Aesthetic
International gymnastics competitions hosted by Denmark
World Aesthetic Gymnastics Championships
International sports competitions hosted by the Faroe Islands
Sport in Tórshavn